Abduction: The Megumi Yokota Story is an American documentary about Megumi Yokota, a Japanese student who was abducted by a North Korean agent in 1977.

The film made its world premiere at the 2006 Slamdance Film Festival and has won numerous awards.  It was made by Canadian journalists Chris Sheridan and Patty Kim made and released in 37 theaters in Tokyo and 17 other prefectures, including Hokkaido, Kanagawa, Osaka, Hiroshima and Fukuoka. It was also released in theaters in the United States, opening on August 18, 2006, at the Hollywood Arc Light Cinema in Los Angeles.

Among its honors, this film was named best documentary at the San Francisco International Asian American Film Festival, the Austin Film Festival, the Asian Film Festival of Dallas and won the audience award at the Omaha and Slamdance Film Festivals in 2006. The film has been shown at some of the largest festivals all over the world including the Sydney Film Festival in Australia, the International Documentary Festival of Amsterdam in The Netherlands and the Hot Docs Film Festival in Canada. In January 2009, the film was honored with the prestigious Alfred I. duPont Award, one of the highest distinctions in American journalism.

The film has also been broadcast on TV, and featured in theaters in Hong Kong, Canada, Belgium, Denmark, the United Kingdom, Israel, France, Australia, Germany, Switzerland, France, Singapore and many others.

Premise

The documentary is told from the eyes of Megumi's mother and father as they learned the grave truth of their daughter's abduction, and their thirty-year search for the truth.

Awards 

At a ceremony at Columbia University in New York on January 22, 2009, the filmmakers were awarded the Alfred I. duPont Silver Baton, one of the highest distinctions in American journalism.

 Best Documentary, Audience Award: 2006 Slamdance Film Festival
 Best Documentary, Audience Award: 2006 Omaha Film Festival
 Jury Prize, Best Documentary: 2006 San Francisco International Asian American Film Festival
 Top Ten Audience Favorite: 2006 Hot Docs
 Best Documentary: 2006 Asian Film Festival of Dallas
 Best Documentary: 2006 Austin Film Festival
 Top Five Audience Favorite: 2006 Sydney Film Festival
 Nominee, Best Feature Documentary, United Nations International Film Festival on Human Rights 2007
 Nominee, Best Feature Documentary: 2006 Atlanta Film Festival
 Nominee, Best Feature Documentary: 2006 Starz Denver Film Festival
 Nominee, Best Feature Documentary: 2006 Independent Film Festival of Boston
 Official Selection: 2006 IDA Docuweek Theatrical Showcase
 Official Selection: 2006 International Documentary Festival of Amsterdam
 Official Selection: 2007 Docaviv International Film Festival
 Official Selection: 2007 Thessaloniki International Film Festival

See also
North Korean abductions of Japanese
Megumi Yokota
Megumi (manga), a manga and anime adaptation of Yokota's story

References

External links
Official film site
ABDUCTION: The Megumi Yokota Story  site for Independent Lens on PBS
 
 PBS's Foreign Exchange with Fareed Zakaria, [In Focus: ABDUCTION http://foreignexchange.tv/?q=node/1690]
 Giovanni Fazio, "Testimony to an unwavering love", The Japan Times, November 23, 2006
 Efilmcritic review ["Goes from true crime story to world politics with an emotional wallop" http://efilmcritic.com/review.php?movie=13704]
 Anita Huslin, "Stealing Lives To Pilfer Secrets", The Washington Post, November 24, 2006
 New York Post film review https://web.archive.org/web/20070128044807/http://www.nypost.com/seven/01122007/entertainment/movies/hope_amid_tears_movies_v_a__musetto.htm
 New York Times movie listing http://movies2.nytimes.com/gst/movies/movie.html?v_id=346126
 New Yorker movie review http://www.newyorker.com/arts/critics/cinema/2007/01/22/070122crci_cinema_lane
 Slant magazine movie review https://web.archive.org/web/20070110100600/http://www.slantmagazine.com/film/film_review.asp?ID=2732
 Los Angeles Times movie review http://www.calendarlive.com/movies/screening/cl-wk-screen17aug17,0,856731.story?coll=cl-screening
 Government Internet TV site
 duPont Award story https://web.archive.org/web/20090129193123/http://www.tvweek.com/newspro-telling-the-story/index.php

American documentary films
Japanese documentary films
North Korean abductions of Japanese citizens
Documentary films about crime
Documentary films about North Korea
Films about child abduction in Japan
2006 films
2006 documentary films
2000s English-language films
2000s American films
2000s Japanese films